Clypeobarbus hypsolepis is a species of ray-finned fish in the genus Clypeobarbus from West Africa.

References 

 

Clypeobarbus
Fish described in 1959